Shepton Mallet (Charlton Road) was a station on the Somerset and Dorset Joint Railway in the county of Somerset in England. Opened as Shepton Mallet on 20 July 1874, it was renamed to avoid confusion with the nearby GWR station in 1883.  The station consisted of two platforms with the station building on the up side. There was also a goods yard and cattle dock controlled from a  signal box.

The station closed to goods in 1963: passenger services were withdrawn when the SDJR closed in 1966.

Further reading

External links
 Somerset & Dorset Joint Railway page on Shepton Mallet station
 Station on navigable O.S. map
 Shepton Mallet remains

Disused railway stations in Somerset
Former Somerset and Dorset Joint Railway stations
Railway stations in Great Britain opened in 1874
Railway stations in Great Britain closed in 1966
Beeching closures in England
Shepton Mallet